Vladimir Sergeyevich Kisenkov (born 8 October 1981) is a former Russian footballer.

Club career
He is famous for his strong long range shots.

Shortly after transferring to FC Dynamo Moscow in the summer of 2010, he was injured during training session in a collision with Kevin Kurányi and had to miss the rest of the 2010 season before he could play a single official game for his new club.

References

External links
 

1981 births
Living people
Sportspeople from Kaluga
Russian footballers
Association football defenders
PFC Spartak Nalchik players
Russian Premier League players
FC Dynamo Moscow players
FC Rostov players
FC Tom Tomsk players
FC Vityaz Podolsk players
FC Lokomotiv Kaluga players